Jum Hwan Choi (born June 9, 1963) is a South Korean former professional boxer who competed from 1983 to 1990. He is a world champion in two weight classes, having held the IBF light-flyweight title from 1986 to 1988 and the WBC strawweight title from 1989 to 1990.

Professional career 
Choi turned professional in 1983 and in 1986 captured the vacant IBF light-flyweight title with a decision win over Park Cho-woon. He defended the belt three times before losing it to Tacy Macalos in a rematch in 1988. He moved down in weight to beat Napa Kiatwanchai for the and WBC strawweight title the following year, but lost the belt in his first defense to Hideyuki Ohashi by knockout, and retired after the loss.

Professional boxing record

See also 
List of IBF world champions
List of WBC world champions

References

External links 
 
Choi Jum-hwan - CBZ Profile

1963 births
International Boxing Federation champions
Living people
World Boxing Council champions
World flyweight boxing champions
Mini-flyweight boxers
World mini-flyweight boxing champions
South Korean male boxers